Kazachinskoye Airport  is a civilian airport in Russia located 1 km northwest of Kazachinskoye.

Passenger

References

Airports built in the Soviet Union
Airports in Irkutsk Oblast